Shahrukh Bek, later referred to as Shahrukh Khan was the leader of the Kokand Khanate and Uzbek Mings tribe from  to  and alleged descendant of Babur though the legend of Altun Bishik. 

As the first ruler of the independent Kokand Khanate after separation from Bukhara, he ordered nobles to have a fortified castle constructed in the region. Before his death, reported to be around 1721 the new khanate acquired the cities of Margilan, Namagan, and Isfara in addition to the new capital Kokand.

His oldest son, Abd al-Rahim Biy, took over the Khanate after his death.

References

Footnotes

Khans of Kokand
18th-century monarchs in Asia